Elisabeth Furse (30 August 1910 – 14 October 2002) was a Communist activist, World War II resistance escape route organizer, and London bistro proprietress.

Early life
She was born Louise Ruth Wolpert in Königsberg, East Prussia (now Kaliningrad), and brought up in Berlin. Her father, Paul Wolpert, was a Russian-speaking Latvian Jew and a wealthy textile merchant. She was nicknamed "Lisl" by an aunt, from which she derived Elisabeth, the name she later adopted for herself.

Political activist
As a teenager she joined the Communist Party, and in her early twenties collected money in France and England to help political refugees in Germany to escape the Nazis.

In 1934, she married Bertie Coker, a fellow Communist. It was a marriage of convenience for a new nationality and legal residence outside Germany, where her activities with the Communists put her at risk of arrest and execution by the Gestapo. She left the Communist movement in 1934.

Second World War
Her second marriage was to Peter Haden-Guest. Their son, Anthony Haden-Guest, was born in 1937. The marriage was dissolved in 1945.

Elisabeth was in France when war broke out. She made her way to Marseilles, where she joined MI9 and, with Ian Garrow, helped those opposed to the Germans escape occupied France via the Pat O'Leary Line escape route. Her group was eventually betrayed, and after her release she returned to London. She spent the rest of the war on the Devon estate of Patrick Furse, who was to become her third husband. They had four children.

In 1953 she started The Bistro, behind London's Royal Court Theatre with her husband. Under her eccentric management, The Bistro became a regular haunt of various journalists, politicians, artists, and society figures, many of whom went on to become well-known public figures.

Memoir
Furse wrote her life memoir, Dream Weaver, with the assistance of writer Ann Barr.

Death
She died in 2002, aged 92, and was interred in Brompton Cemetery, London.

References

Bibliography
 

1910 births
2002 deaths
British Jews
British memoirists
Burials at Brompton Cemetery
Jewish emigrants from Nazi Germany to the United Kingdom
German communists
Women in World War II
People from Berlin
German people of Latvian descent
German people of Russian-Jewish descent
Naturalised citizens of the United Kingdom
British communists
British restaurateurs
Women restaurateurs
Trade unionists from London
British people of Lithuanian-Jewish descent
Haden-Guest family
20th-century memoirists